Livin' Large is a studio album released in 1989 by the Washington, D.C.-based go-go band E.U. The album included the charting singles "Buck Wild", "Livin' Large", and "Taste of Your Love". This album also includes the 1988 hip-hop/go-go song "Shake Your Thang", a collaboration with Salt-N-Pepa which was previously released on their 1988 album A Salt with a Deadly Pepa.

Track listing

Charts

Album

Singles

References

External links
 Livin' Large at Discogs

1989 albums
Experience Unlimited albums
Virgin Records albums